Demiri is a surname. Notable people with the surname include:

Alajdin Demiri (1954–2019), Albanian politician
Besir Demiri (born 1994), Albanian footballer 
Elidon Demiri (born 1979), Albanian football coach and former player
Ertan Demiri (born 1979), Macedonian footballer
Muhamed Demiri (born)

See also
Stringos